Holly Hughes (born December 28, 1957) is a former Republican National Committee member from the State of Michigan was a member of the Michigan House of Representatives from the 91st district.

Early life 
Hughes was born in Grand Rapids, Michigan. Hughes's father is Bern Bolema.

Education 
In 1981, Hughes earned a bachelor's degree in business from Michigan State University.

Career 
Hughes was previously a business woman in Montague, Michigan.

Hughes has been involved in grassroot politics since 1989. She has worked on numerous political campaigns from stuffing envelopes to a campaign manager. She has held several positions in public service from county and district level, and the Michigan Republican Party, including precinct Delegate, Treasurer, County Vice Chair, County Chair, District Chair and campaign county chair for George W. Bush, Spencer Abraham, Terri Land, and Mike Cox, among other noteworthy politicians. Hughes also served as a White River Township Trustee, and is a former Montague Area Public School board member. She was also appointed by Michigan Governor John Engler to the MUSTFA Board.

Hughes is also a former Republican National Committeewoman, as well as a member of the Michigan House of Representatives.

On November 4, 2008, Hughes sought a seat in the Michigan House of Representatives for district 91 but lost the election. Hughes had 46.25% of the votes and was defeated by Mary Valentine with 53.75% of the votes.

In 2010, Democrat Mary Valentine was term-limited. On November 2, 2010, Hughes won the election and became a member of Michigan House of Representatives for district 91. Hughes defeated Ben Gillette with 55.94% of the votes. On November 6, 2012, as an incumbent, Hughes lost the 2012 election for district 91. Hughes had 47.27% of the votes and was defeated by Collene Lamonte with 48.10% of the votes.

Hughes announced her intent to seek the same seat in the legislature in 2014, facing off with Representative Lamonte in a rematch, winning the election by 58 votes. She would defeat Lamonte again in 2016.

As she is term limited in 2018, she has filed to run to replace Goeff Hansen in the 34th State Senate district. She would narrowly lose the in the republican primary to fellow state rep Jon Bumstead 51.7% to 48.3%.

Personal life 
Hughes' husband is Richard. They have two daughters. Hughes and her family live in Muskegon, Michigan.

See also 
 2010 Michigan House of Representatives election

References

External links 
 Official website for Holly Hughes
 
 Holly Hughes at ballotpedia.org

1957 births
Living people
Republican Party members of the Michigan House of Representatives
Michigan State University alumni
Women state legislators in Michigan
21st-century American politicians
21st-century American women politicians
People from Montague, Michigan